Neil Richard Flynn (born November 13, 1960) is an American actor and comedian. He is best known for his roles as Janitor on Scrubs and Mike Heck in the ABC comedy series The Middle. He has had notable appearances in television series, such as That '70s Show, CSI, and Smallville and the television films It's a Very Merry Muppet Christmas Movie and Wake Up, Ron Burgundy: The Lost Movie.

His film career includes appearances in The Fugitive, Home Alone 3, Mean Girls, Indiana Jones and the Kingdom of the Crystal Skull and The Resurrection of Gavin Stone. His voice-over work extends to films such as Cloudy with a Chance of Meatballs, TV shows including Bob's Burgers, Buzz Lightyear of Star Command, Clone High, King of the Hill and the Ratchet & Clank video games.

In 2015, he starred in the DC Comics web series Vixen, set in the Arrowverse. In 2019, he starred alongside Natalie Morales in the NBC sitcom Abby's.

Early life
Flynn was born on the south side of Chicago, Illinois. He is of Irish descent and was raised in a devout Catholic household. He moved to Waukegan, Illinois, at an early age. 

As a student at Waukegan East High School in 1978, he and partner Mike Shklair won an Illinois Individual Events championship for Humorous Duet Acting. He attended Bradley University in Peoria, Illinois, where he was a member of Sigma Nu fraternity, acted in plays, and participated on the Bradley University Speech Team. 

After graduating in 1982, Flynn returned to Chicago to pursue an acting career.

Career
In Chicago, he acted with the renowned Goodman and Steppenwolf theaters. Flynn was nominated for a Joseph Jefferson Award (Actor in a Principal Role, for The Ballad of the Sad Cafe, 1986). He also performed at the Improv Olympic and the Second City Comedy Troupe. In 1998, he founded the improv team Beer Shark Mice with David Koechner, which was still active as of 2015.

Although his role on Scrubs had been to that point the most visible, he had other small roles in a variety of different TV shows and movies, including That '70s Show, Baby's Day Out, CSI, My Boys, Seinfeld, and Smallville.

In The Fugitive, he plays a Chicago police officer who is killed by the one-armed man, Frederick Sykes (Andreas Katsulas) while he is fighting Dr. Richard Kimble (Harrison Ford). This role was used in a subplot of the Scrubs episode "My Friend the Doctor" when J.D. (Zach Braff) notices Flynn's character in the film and believes that Flynn's Janitor character is the actor in the film. In 2008, Flynn worked with Harrison Ford again, playing a suspicious law enforcement official as FBI agent Smith in Indiana Jones and the Kingdom of the Crystal Skull.

Flynn had a minor role in Mean Girls as the father of Lindsay Lohan's character. He then played the part of an anonymous police officer in Anchorman: The Legend of Ron Burgundy; this scene was cut out of the final version of the film, though it can be viewed in the straight-to-DVD spin-off film Wake Up, Ron Burgundy: The Lost Movie, and in the deleted scenes of the Anchorman DVD. He had a minor role in Major League as a longshoreman and fan of the Cleveland Indians. Flynn had a role on Phil Hendrie's animated pilot that was not picked up by FOX. He was also the first baseman in the movie Rookie of the Year.

Flynn appeared in an episode of The Drew Carey Show, playing the fake husband of future Scrubs co-star Christa Miller. He appeared in an episode of Seinfeld, playing a police officer.

Scrubs
For Scrubs, Flynn auditioned for the role of Dr. Cox, but was given the role of Janitor, instead. Flynn was originally only cast for the first episode ("My First Day"), but he became a regular, playing a character known only as the Janitor, who devotes much of his energy to menacing young Dr. John "J.D." Dorian. His name is not revealed in the series until the season 8 finale when, upon J.D.'s first time asking about it, he simply says his name is Glenn Matthews. This is also speculated to be false for two reasons: first, after J.D. leaves the shot, an orderly addresses the Janitor as "Tommy"; and second, while watching The Fugitive with Carla and Danni (Dr. Cox's sister-in-law, played by Tara Reid) in the season 3 episode 'My Friend The Doctor', J.D. notices the real-life Flynn's character in the train scene. When the Janitor confirms he was in the movie at the end of the episode, some fans speculated the Janitor's name in Scrubs is Neil Flynn, but this was dismissed by Flynn in an interview. Flynn was a series regular with Scrubs through the first eight seasons. When Scrubs was cancelled by NBC and subsequently picked up by ABC, he signed a second position one-year deal for Scrubs season 9, which would have allowed him to continue on Scrubs if his pilot The Middle was not picked up. The Middle pilot was picked up, but he appeared as a guest star in Scrubs season 9 premiere.

The Middle
Flynn's long-running role, Mike Heck, was on ABC's The Middle (2009–2018). The character had three children and worked at the Orson Limestone Quarry. The Heck Family was a working-class family in Indiana. In 2017, the series celebrated 200 episodes.

For his work on The Middle, Flynn was nominated for Best Supporting Actor in a Comedy Series at the 6th Critics' Choice Television Awards.

Voice-over work
Flynn has also done voice acting for the animated series Buzz Lightyear of Star Command, though he is better known for voicing the popular characters Skidd McMarx and the Plumber in the first three Ratchet & Clank games for the PlayStation 2. He also made a guest appearance in Kim Possible.

Flynn voiced the character Max Flush on the FOX TV show Bob's Burgers in the episode "O.T.: The Outside Toilet".

As of 2015, he is providing the voice of Chuck, the foster father of the title character in the DC Comics animated web series Vixen.

Honors and awards
2017: American Forensic Association National Events Tournament Distinguished Alumni Award

Filmography

Film

Television

Web

Video games

References

External links
 
 Cast biography at scrubstv.com
 Beer, Shark, Mice at iO WEST

1960 births
Living people
Actors from Waukegan, Illinois
American male film actors
American male stage actors
American male television actors
American male video game actors
American male voice actors
American people of Irish descent
Bradley University alumni
Catholics from Illinois
Male actors from Chicago
20th-century American male actors
21st-century American male actors